Ridgeway Tillakaratne was civil servant of repute & a broadcaster in Sri Lanka. He was Chairman and Director-general of the then Ceylon Broadcasting Corporation

Early life and education
Ridgeway was educated at Nalanda College, Colombo. Two of his famous classmates at Nalanda were Chitrananda Abeysekera and Karunaratne Abeysekera and contemporaries being Henry Jayasena, Stanley Jayasinghe and Gunadasa Amarasekara .

Career
Ridgeway Thilakeratne also has held posts of being Government Agent of Pollonnaruwa, Hambanthota, Ratnapura Districts and Permanent Secretary to Ministry of Information and Broadcasting

See also
 Sri Lanka Broadcasting Corporation

References 

 Reflections on Karunaratne Abeysekera
 
 Notable Old Boys of Nalanda College Colombo

Alumni of Nalanda College, Colombo
Sri Lankan Buddhists
Sri Lankan radio personalities
Sinhalese civil servants
1931 births
1981 deaths